Neea darienensis is a species of plant in the Nyctaginaceae family. It is endemic to Panama.  It is threatened by habitat loss.

References

Endemic flora of Panama
darienensis
Vulnerable plants
Taxonomy articles created by Polbot